Jahquil Hill (born 15 January 1997) is a Bermudian international footballer who plays as a goalkeeper for Robin Hood.

Club career
Hill played for United FC, before signing a two-year scholarship with English club Mansfield Town in 2013. He then played for Ilkeston. After leaving Ilkeston in 2017 he trialled for Chesterfield. After a spell with Stafford Rangers, he moved to Rushall Olympic in October 2017. After being scouted by Canadian club Oakville Blue Devils following their pre-season in Bermuda, he had initially agreed to join the club's U21 team, but soon after changed his mind in favour of pursuing his education. He moved to English club Hereford in March 2019.

On 7 September 2019, Hill joined Stafford Rangers.

In 2020, he joined Bermudan club Robin Hood

In October 2021 he joined Stalybridge Celtic on dual registration terms, playing in two Northern Premier League matches that month.

International career
He made his international debut for Bermuda in 2017. Later that year he declined a call-up, to concentrate on his club career.

Personal life
His father, Kuma Smith, was also a footballer.

References

1997 births
Living people
Bermudian footballers
Bermuda international footballers
Mansfield Town F.C. players
Ilkeston F.C. players
Stafford Rangers F.C. players
Rushall Olympic F.C. players
Hereford F.C. players
Association football goalkeepers
Bermudian expatriate footballers
Bermudian expatriate sportspeople in England
Expatriate footballers in England
Bermudian expatriate sportspeople in Canada
Expatriate soccer players in Canada
Robin Hood F.C. players
Bermuda youth international footballers
Stalybridge Celtic F.C. players